Nekton or necton (from the ) refers to the actively swimming aquatic organisms in a body of water. The term was proposed by German biologist Ernst Haeckel to differentiate between the active swimmers in a body of water, and the passive organisms that were carried along by the current, the plankton. As a guideline, nektonic organisms have a high Reynolds number (greater than 1000) and planktonic organisms a low one (less than 10). However, some organisms can begin life as plankton and transition to nekton later on in life, sometimes making distinction difficult when attempting to classify certain plankton-to-nekton species as one or the other. For this reason, some biologists choose not to use this term.

History

The term was first proposed and used by the German biologist Ernst Haeckel in 1891 in his article Plankton-Studien where he contrasted it with plankton, the aggregate of passively floating, drifting, or somewhat motile organisms present in a body of water, primarily tiny algae and bacteria, small eggs and larvae of marine organisms, and protozoa and other minute consumers.  Today it is sometimes considered an obsolete term because it often does not allow for the meaningful quantifiable distinction between these two groups.  Some biologists no longer use it.

Definition
As a guideline, nekton are larger and tend to swim largely at biologically high Reynolds numbers (>103 and up beyond 109), where inertial flows are the rule, and eddies (vortices) are easily shed. Plankton, on the other hand, are small and, if they swim at all, do so at biologically low Reynolds numbers (0.001 to 10), where the viscous behavior of water dominates, and reversible flows are the rule. Organisms such as jellyfish and others are considered plankton when they are very small and swim at low Reynolds numbers, and considered nekton as they grow large enough to swim at high Reynolds numbers.  Many animals considered classic examples of nekton (e.g., Mola mola, squid, marlin) start out life as tiny members of the plankton and then, it was argued, gradually transition to nekton as they grow.

Oceanic nekton 
Oceanic nekton comprises animals largely from three clades:
Vertebrates form the largest contribution; these animals are supported by either bones or cartilage.
Mollusks are animals such as squids and scallops.
Crustaceans are animals such as lobsters and crabs.

There are organisms whose initial life stage is identified as being planktonic but when they grow and increase in body size they become nektonic. A typical example is the medusa of the jellyfish.

See also 
 Neuston (organisms, including microscopic, living at the surface of the water)
 Plankton (organisms, including microscopic, floating and drifting within water)
 Benthos (organisms, including microscopic, living at the bottom of a body of water)
 Pelagic fish (fish living in the pelagic zone of ocean or lake waters – living neither close to the bottom nor near the shore)

References

External links 

 Stefan Nehring and Ute Albrecht (1997): "Hell und das redundante Benthon: Neologismen in der deutschsprachigen Limnologie". In: Lauterbornia H. 31: 17-30, Dinkelscherben, December 1997 E-Text (PDF-Datei)

Aquatic ecology
Aquatic organisms
Oceanographical terminology